Kioma is a rural locality in the Goondiwindi Region, Queensland, Australia. In the  Kioma had a population of 30 people.

Geography 
The Meandarra – Talwood Road (State Route 74) forms part of the western boundary.

History

John Hubert Fairfax formed “Kioma” Station in the early twentieth century. He was a grandson of John Fairfax, one of the early proprietors of The Sydney Morning Herald, and his wife was Ruth Fairfax (née Dowling), a founding member of the Australian Country Women's Association.

Kioma State School opened on 9 November 1959 in response to a request from the managers of "Kioma" Station.

In the  Kioma had a population of 30 people.

Economy 
There are a number of homesteads in the locality:

 Denver
 Kioma, as of 2019 operated by JH Fairfax and Son
Kioma Station has an airstrip adjacent to the school.

Education 
Kioma State School is a government primary (Prep-6) school for boys and girls at Kioma Road. In 2018, the school had an enrolment of 15 students with 3 teachers (2 full-time equivalent) and 5 non-teaching staff (2 full-time equivalent).

There is no secondary school in Kioma. The nearest is Goondiwindi State High School in Goondiwindi to the south-east but at such a distance that distance education and boarding school would be other options.

References

Further reading 

 

Goondiwindi Region
Localities in Queensland